The University of Göttingen, officially the Georg August University of Göttingen, (known informally as Georgia Augusta) is a public research university in the city of Göttingen, Germany. Founded in 1734 by George II, King of Great Britain and Elector of Hanover, and starting classes in 1737, the Georgia Augusta was conceived to promote the ideals of the Enlightenment. It is the oldest university in the state of Lower Saxony and the largest in student enrollment, which stands at around 31,600.

Home to many noted figures, it represents one of Germany's historic and traditional institutions. According to an official exhibition held by the University of Göttingen in 2002, 44 Nobel Prize winners had been affiliated with the University of Göttingen as alumni, faculty members or researchers by that year alone.  

The University of Göttingen was previously supported by the German Universities Excellence Initiative, holds memberships to the U15 Group of major German research universities and to the Coimbra Group of major European research universities. Furthermore, the university maintains strong connections with major research institutes based in Göttingen, such as those of the Max Planck Society and the Leibniz Association. With approximately 9 million media units, the Göttingen State and University Library ranks among the largest libraries in Germany.

History

Inauguration 
In 1734, King George II of Great Britain, who was also Elector of Hanover, gave his Prime Minister in Hanover, Gerlach Adolph von Münchhausen, the order to establish a university in Göttingen to propagate the ideas and values associated with the European Enlightenment.

Initially, the only new buildings constructed for the opening of the university were a riding hall and a fencing house, while courses were taught in the Paulinerkirche and associated Dominican monastery, or in the homes of professors. No university auditorium was built until well into the 19th century.

18th–19th centuries
Throughout the remainder of the 18th century the University of Göttingen was in the top rank of German universities, with its free spirit and atmosphere of scientific exploration and research. Famously, Georg Christoph Lichtenberg was the first to hold a professorship (1769–99) explicitly dedicated to experimental physics in Germany. By 1812, Göttingen had become an internationally acknowledged modern university with a library of more than 200,000 volumes.

In the first years of the University of Göttingen, it became known especially for its Faculty of Law. In the 18th century Johann Stephan Pütter, a scholar of public law at that time, taught jus publicum for half a century. The subject had attracted students such as Klemens Wenzel Lothar von Metternich, later diplomat and Prime Minister of Austria, and Wilhelm von Humboldt, who later established the University of Berlin. In 1809 Arthur Schopenhauer, the German philosopher best known for his work The World as Will and Representation, became a student at the university, where he studied metaphysics and psychology under Gottlob Ernst Schulze, who advised him to concentrate on Plato and Kant. By the university's centenary in 1837, it was known as the "university of law," as the students enrolled by the faculty of law often made up more than half of the university's students. Göttingen became a Mecca for the study of public law in Germany.

During this time, the University of Göttingen achieved renown for its critical work on history as well. An Enlightenment institution, it produced the Göttingen School of History.

However, political disturbances, in which both professors and students were implicated, lowered the attendance to 860 in 1834. The expulsion in 1837 of the seven professors – the so-called Die Göttinger Sieben (the Germanist Wilhelm Eduard Albrecht (1800–1876), the historian Friedrich Christoph Dahlmann (1785–1860), the orientalist Georg Heinrich August Ewald (1803–1875), the historian Georg Gottfried Gervinus (1805–1875), the physicist Wilhelm Eduard Weber (1804–1891), and the philologist brothers Jakob (1785–1863) and Wilhelm Grimm (1786–1859)) – for protesting against the revocation by Ernest Augustus, King of Hanover, of the liberal constitution of 1833 further reduced the prosperity of the university.

Otto von Bismarck, the main creator and the first Chancellor of the second German Empire, had also studied law in Göttingen in 1833: he lived in a tiny house on the "Wall," now known as "Bismarck Cottage". According to oral tradition, he lived there because his rowdiness had caused him to be banned from living within the city walls.

Turn of the 20th century
At the end of the 19th and beginning of the 20th century, the University of Göttingen achieved its academic peak. Göttingen maintained a strong focus on natural science, especially mathematics. By 1900, David Hilbert and Felix Klein had attracted mathematicians from around the world to Göttingen, which made it a leading center of mathematics by the turn of the 20th century. Likewise, the Faculty of Theology in conjunction with other orientalists and ancient historians across the university became an international center for the study of religion and antiquity.
In 1903, its teaching staff numbered 121 and its students 1529. Ludwig Prandtl joined the university in 1904, and developed it into a leader in fluid mechanics and in aerodynamics over the next two decades. In 1925, Prandtl was appointed as the director of the Kaiser Wilhelm Institute for Fluid Mechanics. He introduced the concept of boundary layer and founded mathematical aerodynamics by calculating air flow in the down wind direction. Many of Prandtl's students went on to make fundamental contributions to aerodynamics.

From 1921 to 1933, the physics theory group was led by Max Born, who, during this time, became one of the three discoverers of the non-relativistic theory of quantum mechanics. He may also have been the first to propose its probabilistic relationship with classical physics. It was one of the main centers of the development of modern physics.

During this time, the German language became an international academic language. A number of dissertations in the UK and the US had German titles. One might be considered having had a complete academic training only when one had studied in Germany. Thus, many American students were proud of having studied in Germany, and the University of Göttingen had profound impacts on the US. A number of American politicians, lawyers, historians and writers received their education from both Harvard and Göttingen. For example, Edward Everett, once Secretary of State and President of Harvard University, stayed in Göttingen for two years of study. George Ticknor spent two years studying classics in Göttingen. Even John Lothrop Motley, a diplomat and historian, had personal friendship with Otto von Bismarck during his two-year-long study in Göttingen. George Bancroft, a politician and historian, received his PhD from the University of Göttingen in 1820.

"Great purge" of 1933
In the 1930s, the university became a focal point for the Nazi crackdown on "Jewish physics", as represented by the work of Albert Einstein. In what was later called the "great purge" of 1933, academics including Max Born, Victor Goldschmidt, James Franck, Eugene Wigner, Leó Szilárd, Edward Teller, Edmund Landau, Emmy Noether, and Richard Courant were expelled or fled. Most of them fled Nazi Germany for places like the United States, Canada, and the United Kingdom. Following the great purge, in 1934 David Hilbert, by then a symbol of German mathematics, was dining with Bernhard Rust, the Nazi minister of education. Rust asked, “How is mathematics at Göttingen, now that it is free from the Jewish influence?” Hilbert replied, “There is no mathematics in Göttingen anymore.”

Renovation after War
After World War II, the University of Göttingen was the first university in the western Zones to be re-opened under British control in 1945.

Campus

The university is spread out in several locations around the city.

The central university complex with the Central Library and Mensa (student refectory/dining hall) is located right next to the inner city and comprises the faculties for Theology, Social sciences, Law, Economics/Business Administration and Linguistics. The departments of Ancient History, Classics, various languages, Psychology and Philosophy are nearby. Located to the south of the city is the Faculty of Mathematics and Computer Science with its main building, the Mathematisches Institut, on the same street as the German Aerospace Center and the Max Planck Institute for Dynamics and Self-Organisation. In other parts of the city are the departments of Anthropology and Educational Sciences as well as the Medical Faculty with its associated hospitals.

Just north of the city a new scientific center has been built in which most of the natural sciences (chemistry, biology, plant pathology, agronomy, forestry, geology, physics, computer science) are now located, including the GZMB. Other institutes are set around the inner city.

Library 

Closely linked with the university is the Göttingen State and University Library (German: Niedersächsische Staats- und Universitätsbibliothek Göttingen, or SUB Göttingen). With around 9 million media units and precious manuscripts, the library is designed for Göttingen University as well as the central library for the German State of Lower Saxony (with its central catalogue) and for the Göttingen Academy of Sciences, founded as the 'Royal Society for Sciences'.

Gardens
The university maintains three botanical gardens: the Alter Botanischer Garten der Universität Göttingen, the Neuer Botanischer Garten der Universität Göttingen, and the Forstbotanischer Garten und Pflanzengeographisches Arboretum der Universität Göttingen.

Organisation

Today the university consists of 13 faculties and around 31,600 students are enrolled. More than 400 professors and 4,000 academic staff work at the university, assisted by a technical and administrative staff of over 7,000. The post-war expansion of the university led to the establishment of a new, modern "university quarter" in the north of the city. The architecture of the old university can still be seen in the Auditorium Maximum (1826/1865) and the Great Hall (1835/1837) at Wilhelmsplatz.

Faculties, centers, and institutes 
The University of Göttingen encompasses 13 faculties and a total of 36 additional centers and institutes (including associated centers and institutes but excluding institutes or departments within the faculties themselves).

Faculties

 Faculty of Agricultural Sciences
 Faculty of Biology and Psychology
 Faculty of Chemistry
 Faculty of Forest Sciences and Forest Ecology
 Faculty of Geoscience and Geography
 Faculty of Mathematics and Computer Science
 Faculty of Physics
 Faculty of Law
 Faculty of Social Sciences
 Faculty of Economic Sciences
 Faculty of Humanities
 Faculty of Theology
 Medical Center (Universitätsmedizin Göttingen)

Centers and institutes
Humanities and Theology
 Centre for Global Migration Studies (CeMig)
 Centre for Modern East Asian Studies (CeMEAS)
 Centre for Modern Indian Studies (CeMIS)
 Centrum Orbis Orientalis et Occidentalis (CORO) – Centre for Ancient and Oriental Studies
 The Göttingen Centre for Digital Humanities (GCDH)
 Göttinger Center for Genderstudies (GCG)
 International Writing Centre 
 Centre for Medieval and Early Modern Studies (ZMF)
 Center of Modern Humanities (ZTMK)
 Forum for Interdisciplinary Religious Studies (FIRSt)

Natural Sciences, Mathematics, and Informatics
 Bernstein Center for Computational Neuroscience Göttingen (BCCN)
 European Neuroscience Institute (ENI)
 Geoscience Centre
 Göttingen Center for Molecular Biosciences (GZMB)
 International Center for Advanced Studies of Energy Conversion (ICASEC)
 Leibniz-ScienceCampus Primate Cognition
 Center for Computational Sciences
 Centre of Biodiversity and sustainable Land Use
 Center for Integrated Breeding Research
 Centre for Nanoscale Microscopy and Molecular Physiology of the Brain (CNMPB)
 Center for Systems Neuroscience
 Centre for Statistics (ZfS)

Law, Economic Sciences, and Social Sciences
 Center for European, Governance and Economic Development Research (cege)
 Courant Research Centre Poverty, Equity and Growth in Developing Countries
 Göttingen Center for Genderstudies (GGG)
 Diversity Research Institute
 Interdisciplinary Center for Sustainable Development (IZNE)
 Center for Social Science Methods (MZS)
 Centre for Empirical Research into Teaching and Schools (ZeUS)
 Centre for Medical Law

Associated Institutes
 Academic Confucius Institute (AKI)
 Information Network of Departments of Dermatology (IVDK)
 Institute of Sugar Beet Research
 Institute of Applied Plant Nutrition (IAPN)
 Sociological Research Institute (SOFI)
 Institute for Economics in Small Business Economics

Academics

Reputation and rankings 

Within the framework of the 2006–07 German Universities Excellence Initiative, it won funding for its future concept "Tradition, Innovation, Autonomy," its graduate school "Neurosciences and Molecular Biosciences," and its research cluster "Microscopy at the Nanometer Range." In the 2012 Excellence Initiative, Göttingen succeeded in obtaining funds for its graduate school "Neurosciences and Molecular Biosciences" and its research cluster "Microscopy at the Nanometer Range", but failed in its bid for future concept financing. In September 2018, Göttingen succeeded in gaining funds only for its research cluster "Multiscale Bioimaging", and failed in the other applications. Consequently, Göttingen would no longer be eligible for the fourth round of future concept financing across the country in 2019. 

As of 2002, the University of Göttingen was associated with 44 Nobel laureates according to an official count released by the University of Göttingen in that year.  By this number alone, the University of Göttingen ranked among global top 15. The most recent Nobel laureates associated with the university are Klaus Hasselmann (Nobel Prize in Physics, 2021),  Stefan Hell (Nobel Prize in Chemistry, 2014), and Thomas C. Südhof (Nobel Prize in Physiology or Medicine, 2013). Klaus Hasselmann received his PhD in physics from the University of Göttingen in 1957. Stefan Hell has been a lecturer (in Privatdozent capacity) at the University of Göttingen since 2004 and the director of the Max Planck Institute for Biophysical Chemistry in the Göttingen Campus since 2002. Thomas Südhof, currently a professor at Stanford University, worked on his doctoral thesis at the Max Planck Institute for Biophysical Chemistry in the lab of British biochemist Victor P. Whittaker and received his PhD in medical science from the University of Göttingen in 1982.

As of 2021, four out of sixteen in-office Justices of the Federal Constitutional Court, Germany's supreme constitutional court, are affiliated with the University of Göttingen: two of them (Andreas Paulus & Christine Langenfeld) are, currently, professors at the Faculty of Law of the University of Göttingen, while two others (Ines Härtel & Henning Radtke) obtained their PhD in law (Dr.iur) from the University of Göttingen. Also in 2021, Georg Nolte, a former professor of public international law at the University of Göttingen, took office as Judge of the International Court of Justice on behalf of the Federal Republic of Germany.

However, Göttingen has declined overall in other international rankings in recent years. For example, in the Shanghai Ranking (ARWU) of 2018, it was ranked 99th, while in 2004 it was ranked 79th. More surprisingly, according to the Times Higher Education World University Rankings, Göttingen was previously ranked 43rd in 2011, but was ranked only 123rd in 2019.

Partner institutions 
Within the Göttingen Campus the university is organizationally and personally interlinked with the following independent and semi-independent institutions:

 Max Planck Institute for Biophysical Chemistry (Karl Friedrich Bonhoeffer Institute)
 Max Planck Institute for Experimental Medicine
 Max Planck Institute for Dynamics and Self-Organization, formerly Max Planck Institute for Flow Research
 Max Planck Institute for the Study of Religious and Ethnic Diversity, formerly Max Planck Institute for History
Max Planck Institute for Solar System Research, formerly Max Planck Institute for Aeronomy
German Primate Center – Leibniz Institute for Primate Research
German Aerospace Center

Exchange programs
As Germany is a member of the European Union, university students have the opportunity to participate in the Erasmus Programme. The university also has exchange programs and partnerships with reputable universities outside Europe such as University of Technology Sydney in Australia, Tsinghua University, Peking University and Fudan University in China, The University of Tokyo in Japan and the University of California, Berkeley, in the United States.

Summer school
The university organizes summer courses for international and local students. One of the courses are in Data Science, a two-week summer school. It aims at advanced MA- and beginning PhD students from any discipline who are interested in learning about the many facets of data science.
In a series of lectures, the participants will be introduced to the field of data science from different vantage points. Practical sessions will allow students to apply different theories and methods in practice, both individually and in teams. The Social Program includes different events such as sightseeing tours, hiking trips or a joint barbecue. The summer school 2019 took place at the historic Alte Mensa building.

Traditions 
The most famous tradition of the university is that PhD students who have just passed their Rigorosum (oral doctoral examination) or dissertation defense sit in a wagon – decorated with flowers and balloons and accompanied by relatives and friends, drive around the inner city and arrive at the Marktplatz – the central square where the old town hall and the Gänseliesel statue are located. The "newly born doctor" shall climb up to the statue of Gänseliesel (a poor princess in an old fairy tale who was compelled to keep geese by a wicked woman and later regained her identity), kiss the Gänseliesel and give bouquets to her.

Student life 

There is an old saying about life in Göttingen, still inscribed in Latin nowadays on the wall of the entrance to the Ratskeller (the restaurant located in the basement of the old town hall):  (There is no life outside Göttingen. Even if it is life, it is no life like here).

The university offers eight snack shops and six Mensas serving lunch at low prices for the students. One Mensa also provides dinner for students.

Notable people 

Notable people that have studied or taught at Georg-August University include the American banker J. P. Morgan, the seismologist Beno Gutenberg, the endocrinologist Hakaru Hashimoto, who studied there before World War I, and several notable Nobel laureates like Max Planck and Werner Heisenberg. Heinrich Heine, the famous German poet, studied law and was awarded the degree of Dr.iur. Anthropologist Marlina Flassy earned her doctorate there, before becoming the first woman and indigenous Papuan to be appointed Dean at Cenderawasih University.

Jürgen Habermas, a German philosopher and sociologist, pursued his study here in Göttingen. Later, Richard von Weizsäcker, the former President of Germany, earned his Dr.Jur. here. Gerhard Schröder, the former Chancellor of Germany, also graduated from the school of law in Göttingen.

Klemens Wenzel Lothar von Metternich, later diplomat and Prime Minister of Austria, and Wilhelm von Humboldt, who later established the University of Berlin, Arthur Schopenhauer, the German philosopher. The Brothers Grimm had taught here and compiled the first German Dictionary. In the 19th century, Gustav von Hugo and Rudolf von Jhering, a jurist who created the theory of culpa in contrahendo and wrote Battle for Right, taught here and maintained the reputation of the faculty of law, as well as Otto von Bismarck, the main creator and the first Chancellor of the second German Empire.

The German inventor of the jet engine, Pabst von Ohain, also studied aerodynamics under Ludwig Prandtl. Edmund Husserl, the philosopher and known as the father of phenomenology, taught here. Max Weber, the sociologist studied here for one term. Carl Friedrich Gauss taught here in the 19th century. Bernhard Riemann, Peter Gustav Lejeune Dirichlet and a number of significant mathematicians made their contributions to mathematics here. Professor Gunther Heinrich von Berg, Doctor of Law taught at the University 1794 to 1800 and later entered politics.

University buildings

See also

 Göttinger Digitalisierungszentrum
 List of early modern universities in Europe
 List of universities in Germany
 List of forestry universities and colleges

References

Further reading

 Iggers, Georg G. The University of Göttingen, 1760–1800, and the Transformation of Historical Scholarship (Council on International Studies, State University of New York at Buffalo, 1980).
 Iggers, Georg G. "The University of Göttingen, 1760–1800, and the Transformation of Historical Scholarship" Storia della Storiografia (1982), Issue 2, pp 11–37.
 Constance Reid, Hilbert, Springer, 1996, .

External links

 The University of Göttingen – home page
 Shame at Göttingen, detailing the 1933 purge
Scholars and Literati at the University of Göttingen (1603–1800), Repertorium Eruditorum Totius Europae – RETE

 
1734 establishments in the Holy Roman Empire
Gottingen